The Pentax K-7 is a 14.6-megapixel digital single-lens reflex camera, announced on 20 May 2009. This is the first new flagship model released by Pentax since its merger with Hoya Corporation on 31 March 2008. It was discontinued late in 2010 in favour of the K-5.

Features 

The Pentax K-7 was announced on 20 May 2009 and shipping began as of the first week of July 2009. The K-7 has the same pixel count as its predecessor, the K20D, but offers a significantly expanded feature set in a smaller body. New features include:
 body is still weather resistant like the K20D; however, it is now made of magnesium alloy, and it is now also low temperature resistant
 a high-definition video recording function (30 frames per second at 1536×1024 resolution or HDTV (cropped))
 TAv exposure mode: Time/Aperture Value: photographer sets his own desired shutter speed/aperture, while the camera adjusts the ISO accordingly to compensate exposure
 in-camera high dynamic range imaging function to create one composite image from three images with different exposures
 dedicated AF-assist lamp
 in-camera electronic level that works with Earth's gravity, usable in total darkness too (a 1st by Pentax in any camera model from any brand)
 automatic horizon correction
 a new shutter rated for 100,000 actuations and capable of shutter speeds as fast as 1/8000 second
 continuous shooting speed of up to 5.2 frames per second
 a viewfinder with 100% field coverage
 a new Natural-Bright-Matte III focusing screen
 a new autofocus module
 a 77-segment light meter
 a newly developed DR II dust removal system
 a 3″ LCD monitor with a wide angle IPS panel with approximately 921k dots
 Face recognition in live view mode
 a new-generation Shake Reduction mechanism which can compensate for rotational movement
 lighter weight: the K-7 body weighs 55 g (7.5%) less than the K20D
 very quiet shutter

References

External links

 Official web page for the K-7 at PentaxImaging.com

K0007
Pentax K0007
Cameras introduced in 2009
Pentax K-mount cameras